The siege of Patras was one of the first events of the Greek War of Independence. After the outbreak of the revolution, the Greeks under the leadership of the primates of Patras, captured the city and destroyed the Muslim quarter. The Greeks tried to capture also the main fortress of the city. 

In April, an Ottoman army lifted the siege and destroyed a large part of the city, with Patras remaining under Ottoman control almost until the end of the war (1828).

The consul of France in the city at the time was Hugo Pouqueville, brother of François Pouqueville, and for Great Britain Philip James Green.

Aftermath

In February 1822, after a victorious battle outside Patras (Battle of Girokomio), the Greeks under Theodoros Kolokotronis began again the siege of the fortress. It was after the defeat in the Battle of Peta, which allowed the Ottoman army to pass to Achaea, and the Expedition of Dramali that brought an end to the siege.

References

Conflicts in 1821
Patras
History of Patras
1821 in Greece
March 1821 events
Peloponnese in the Greek War of Independence